The McLaren M19A is a Formula One racing car built and run by McLaren in three World Championship seasons between 1971 and 1973.

Design
With Gordon Coppuck preoccupied by designing the McLaren M16 Indianapolis 500 car, the task of designing an all-new Formula 1 car for 1971 fell on Ralph Bellamy. The result was a distinctive car that was nicknamed "The Alligator Car". The pear-shaped cockpit sides that led to this nickname were a result of placing two of the car's three  fuel tanks alongside the driver.

The M19A used inboard coilover shocks for the front and rear suspension, which were actuated through a swinging link that gave an increasing spring rate as the springs were compressed. This linkage was dropped in favor of a conventional system with the M19C. The M19A and M19C both used a mid-mounted Cosworth DFV V8 and Hewland 5-speed manual gearbox.

Competition history

1971
The McLaren M19A debuted at the 1971 South African Grand Prix with 1967 world champion Denny Hulme driving. Peter Gethin continued driving a McLaren M14A until a second M19A was built for the Dutch Grand Prix. Jackie Oliver took over driving the second McLaren for the Austrian Grand Prix after Gethin left to drive for BRM. Hulme scored the M19's first fastest lap at the Canadian Grand Prix, but a string of reliability issues had left McLaren placing only sixth in the Constructor's Championship.

The second car was sponsored by Penske-White Racing for the Canadian Grand Prix and United States Grand Prix. Mark Donohue made his Formula 1 debut in that car at Canada, finishing third. David Hobbs drove the car for the United States Grand Prix.

1972
 McLaren gained a new sponsor for the 1972 Formula One season, the cosmetics and perfume company Yardley of London. The cars were repainted white to reflect this new sponsorship, with only the side fuel tanks continuing to be painted in the traditional McLaren orange.

The season began on a high note with Denny Hulme finishing the Argentine Grand Prix in second place, the first podium finish for a McLaren M19. Peter Revson made his McLaren debut in the second car. The next race proved even better, with both drivers on the podium and Hulme taking both his and McLaren's first win since the 1969 Mexican Grand Prix.

The modified M19C made its debut at Monaco in the hands of Denny Hulme, with Revson and Brian Redman continuing to use the M19A until the Austrian Grand Prix. Revson claimed pole position at the Canadian Grand Prix, McLaren's first ever pole position. Increased reliability over 1971 and a string of podium finishes secured third place in the 1972 Constructor's Championship for McLaren.

Future world champion Jody Scheckter made his Formula 1 debut in a M19A at the United States Grand Prix.

1973
McLaren began the 1973 Formula One season with both Denny Hulme and Peter Revson continuing to drive the M19C. Revson switched to a M19A for the Brazilian Grand Prix, then Hulme was given the new McLaren M23 for the South African Grand Prix. Hulme qualified the M23 on pole and finished fifth, with Revson and Jody Scheckter finishing in second and ninth place in the two M19C's, giving the M19 its 13th and final podium finish. This race would prove to be the last race for a McLaren M19.

Complete Formula One World Championship results
(key) (results in bold indicate pole position; results in italics indicate fastest lap)

** 36 points in  scored using the McLaren M23

References

External links

McLaren Formula One cars
1971 Formula One season cars
1972 Formula One season cars
1973 Formula One season cars